Tangpu may refer to the following locations in China:

 Tongpu Township (同普乡), Jomda County, Tibet
 Tangpu, Jiangxi (棠浦镇), town in Yifeng County
 Tangpu, Zhejiang (汤浦镇), town in Shangyu